"A Substantial Gift (The Broken Promise)" is the first episode of the television series Police Squad!. It was written and directed by Jim Abrahams, David Zucker and Jerry Zucker.

Plot
The episode starts inside the office of the Acme Credit Union.  A young credit union teller named Sally Decker (played by Kathryn Leigh Scott) is arguing with her boss, Jim Johnson, over a loan of money. Sally needs the money to pay a debt to her orthodontist. Johnson declines, saying that due to an upcoming audit, he has to balance the credit union's books and can't loan her any more money. The argument ends as customer Ralph Twice, recently laid off from the Lorman Tire Company, arrives to cash his last payroll check. During the extended identification process, Sally devises a scheme to solve her money problems: she shoots her boss and Mr. Twice, making it look like Twice was trying to rob the credit union by planting a gun on him. She pilfers the cash drawer and then begins screaming to attract attention.  In a sight gag reminiscent of the toll booth scene in "Blazing Saddles", while the teller's cage has the usual heavy security set-up (mesh wire, bars, etc.) when seen straight on from the point of view of Twice, the camera then pans back, showing that Sally Decker's desk, placed side-by-side with the teller's window, is entirely open space and that any would-be robber could easily sidestep the security and enter the teller's cage from the side, which is entirely unprotected.

We then see Frank park his car in front of the credit union, avoiding an absurdly long stretcher removing a body of one of the victims as he enters. He inquires of his boss, Ed Hocken, about the case. Ed tells Frank that the alleged robber, Ralph Twice, is a good family man with no prior record. They both question Sally, who makes a really complicated statement (in the manner of Abbott and Costello's "Who's on First?" routine) in which she makes clear that Twice shot Jim Johnson twice, and then she shot Twice once. As Frank and Ed depart, Sally continues sobbing falsely, believing that they have bought her story.

Frank leaves to go see scientist Ted Olson at the Police Squad crime lab. Ted tells Frank that if the shooter stood where Sally said, the bullet which killed Johnson should have penetrated deeper. Ted demonstrates this by shooting into a shelf of videotapes containing Barbara Walters interviews. Ed and Frank then go a neighborhood in the city called Little Italy (and sure enough, as they drive there, we see Rome's Colosseum in the background) to question Ralph Twice's widow ("We're sorry to bother you at a time like this, Mrs. Twice. We would have come earlier, but your husband wasn't dead then") (continuing the "Little Italy" gag, her apartment apparently has a direct view onto the Leaning Tower of Pisa). She tells them that Ralph didn't have any enemies, although the Democrats didn't like him. Mrs. Twice claims that Ralph was a good man and laments how she's going to break the news of his death to her daughter. Frank and Ed suggest preposterous lies such as: "he was killed by left-wing insurgents from Paraguay", or that "he threw himself on a grenade and saved a battalion", and ultimately that "he was traded to the Cubs for Reggie Jackson". They leave Mrs. Twice in more grief than when they found her. No further progress is made in the next ten hours, so the following morning Frank reports back to Police Squad. While Sally is giving a "formal" statement (wearing an evening dress with a stenographer wearing a tuxedo), Ed and Frank receive the lab reports, brought to them by Al. The lab reports contradict Sally's version of the events, suggesting that the shooter was really much further away from the victims than she claimed.

Act II: Yankees One

Frank tries to discover the position in which Mr. Twice and Jim Johnson stood, by using real people as test subjects and firing real guns. After several hours Frank has a couple of interesting theories, but still nothing conclusive (other than a pile of dead bodies). Frank needs answers, and he knows where he can get them: Johnny the Snitch.

Johnny tells Frank that Ralph would have gotten his job back in two weeks, while Sally used to be Joe Surlov's girlfriend and she got mixed up in penny-ante bunko scams. Frank finds Surlov working at "one of those all night wicker places."  Surlov, who has gone clean, leads Frank to Dr. Zubatski, the orthodontist who treated Sally. Visiting Dr. Zubatski's office, Frank learns that Sally was chronically in arrears with her payments to Zubatski, but that she paid him in full the day after the credit union holdup. Setting up the final confrontation, Frank calls Sally, claiming that he is Zubatski (perfectly imitating his voice merely by placing a handkerchief over the telephone mouthpiece), and threatens her with blackmail in order to arrange a clandestine meeting. As Frank is leaving for the meeting, Ed warns that Sally has already killed two men, so he'd better watch his step. Entering the hallway, Frank immediately steps on something that flips him over by his feet, and we see his silhouette dangling upside down through the frosted glass window.

When Sally sees that the meeting is really with Frank and not Dr. Zubatski, she tries to leave, but Frank tells her what he has discovered. Before Sally was Sally, she was Babs Caltrane, a notorious gun runner in Memphis. But Frank notes that "Babs has red hair!" He grabs Sally's blonde hair, revealing it to be a wig with red hair underneath, showing that Sally is indeed Babs Caltrane. The joke continues as Frank then says before that she was a brunette hitman named ZaSu Pitts, and pulls off yet another wig. He then reveals that before that she sang back up for Aretha Franklin, and removes the brunette wig to reveal a large afro hairstyle. Sally then pulls this wig off, showing a military style buzz cut and claiming before that to have been in the U.S. Marines. Sally throws the red wig into Frank's face, momentarily incapacitating him (a joke that was re-used in The Naked Gun with a pillow instead of a wig). Sally runs away and hides behind some trash cans, and Frank takes cover behind a bench. Frank and Sally start shooting at each other, but we later see that they are really close to each other, a joke that was re-used in The Naked Gun 2½: The Smell of Fear. Eventually they run out of ammunition and start throwing guns at each other. Sally runs out of things to throw and attempts to flee. Just when Sally tries to run away, Ed, Sergeant Take-Her-Away and Sergeant Booker arrive to take her away and book her.

Recurring Jokes
Tonight's special guest star: Lorne Greene, wearing a trench coat, is thrown from a speeding car.  He lands on the ground, then rolls over, wincing in pain and clutching his chest where a knife handle is protruding.  He promptly expires in Police Squad! guest star fashion, setting the precedent for the immediate death of all special guest stars in the series.
Next week's experiment: Some interesting experiments involving discarded swimwear.
Johnny's next customer: A priest wanting information on life after death.
Freeze frame gag: Frank and Ed laugh over a joke, and struggle to maintain the awkward poses as the credits roll.

Alternate versions
In its initial airing on ABC, Drebin could be seen walking in front of a home made banner greeting "Howard, Frank, and Dandy Don"—mimicking similar banners seen greeting the broadcasters on ABC's Monday Night Football. Syndicated reruns and video releases omitted the banner.

Reception
The New York Times largely praised the episode in its preview/review, with many praising the episode's writing.

References

External links

 

1982 American television episodes
Police Squad! episodes
American television series premieres